HMS Hollyhock was a  that served in the Royal Navy.

Hollyhock was laid down at John Crown & Sons Ltd on 27 November 1939 and launched on 19 August 1940.  She was commissioned into the Royal Navy on 19 November 1940.

Hollyhock was bombed and sunk by Japanese naval aircraft launched from the carrier Akagi on 9 April 1942 east of Ceylon in the Indian Ocean, along with the aircraft carrier , the Australian destroyer  and two tankers.

External links

HMS Hollyhock on the Arnold Hague database at convoyweb.org.uk.

 

Flower-class corvettes of the Royal Navy
World War II shipwrecks in the Indian Ocean
1940 ships
Maritime incidents in April 1942
Ships sunk by Japanese aircraft
Corvettes sunk by aircraft